Hudson Avenue station may refer to:
Hudson Avenue station (Erie Railroad), a former railroad station in New Jersey
Hudson/Innes station, a light rail stop in California